Allen Melancthon Sumner Jr. (October 1, 1882 – July 19, 1918) was an officer in the United States Marine Corps.

Biography
Born in Boston, Massachusetts, he initially went to Harvard before securing a place in the Naval Academy. On March 17, 1907, Sumner was commissioned a Second Lieutenant in the Marine Corps. Until 1909 he was stationed in turn at the Marine Barracks of the Naval Academy, Annapolis, Maryland, and Norfolk Navy Yard. He was then ordered to Cuba with the 1st Provisional Regiment of Marines in the Army of Cuban Pacification. He retired on January 1, 1914, after seven years service.

Sumner was recalled as soon as war was declared in April 1917, and began serving on active duty at Marine Barracks, Quantico, on July 5, 1917. When the 1st Machine Gun Battalion (MGB) was formed in August, Sumner was assigned to 81st Company. Sumner trained in the Vosges and was in the front lines in March at Mont-sur-la-Cote on the Verdun Front. On April 29, relieved Major Waller in Command of 81st Company when Major Waller was transferred to the 3rd Division to command the 8th MGB. Participated in the action at Belleau Wood and when Major Cole was wounded on June 10, and Captain Major became battalion commander in his stead (himself to fall five days later), Sumner took his place in command of the right front.

Captain Sumner's death occurred no more than a month later on July 19, at Vierzy, near Soissons, where the 6th MGB was to take part in the attack on Tigny. He was hit by a fragment of a High Explosive shell and killed instantly. Later it was debated whether he had instead fallen during an air raid. Captain Sumner received the Croix de Guerre with Gilt Star as well as 3 Silver Star Citations. He is buried in Plot A, Row 13, Grave 25 in the American Cemetery at Belleau.

Namesakes
The  was a ship of the United States Navy (USN)  during the interwar period. The latter was lead ship for s.

References

External links
      history.navy.mil: USS Allen M. Sumner
Captain Allen Melancthon Sumner, USMC
Allen Melancthon Sumner, Jr. Collection (AFC/2001/001/105990), Veterans History Project, American Folklife Center, Library of Congress.

1882 births
1918 deaths
Harvard University alumni
People from Boston
United States Marine Corps officers
United States Marine Corps personnel of World War I
Recipients of the Croix de Guerre 1914–1918 (France)
Recipients of the Silver Star
American military personnel killed in World War I
Military personnel from Massachusetts